Love and Peace and Sympathy is the 7th studio album by Nottingham band, Six by Seven.

Track listing

Personnel

 Chris Olley - Composer, Guitar, Vocals 
 Martin Cooper - Guitar
 James Flower - Keyboards, Organ (Hammond)
 Steve Hewitt - Drums, Vocals
 Pete Stevenson - Bass

References 

Six by Seven albums
2013 albums
Albums produced by Dan Austin